Below is a list of covered bridges in Iowa. There are nine authentic covered bridges in the U.S. state of Iowa, though two halves of one bridge reside in different locations. Six of them are historic.  A covered bridge is considered authentic not due to its age, but by its construction. An authentic bridge is constructed using trusses rather than other methods such as stringers, a popular choice for non-authentic covered bridges.

Bridges

See also

 List of bridges on the National Register of Historic Places in Iowa
 World Guide to Covered Bridges
 List of covered bridges in Madison County, Iowa

References

External links

 National Society for the Preservation of Covered Bridges
 Only in Your State article about the state's covered bridges

Iowa
 
covered bridges
Bridges, covered